is a railway station in Shinagawa, Tokyo, Japan, operated by Tokyo Monorail and Tokyo Waterfront Area Rapid Transit (TWR). It is a set of two stations connected by an elevated walkway about 100 m long.

Lines

Tokyo Monorail Haneda Airport Line

Platforms
The monorail station has two unnumbered elevated side platforms, and two sets of ticket barriers.

Tokyo Waterfront Rapid Transit

Platforms
The TWR station has an underground station concourse on the basement ("1BF") level, and a single island platform on the third-basement ("3BF") level, serving two tracks. There are three entrances to the station: "A", "B", and "C".

History
The Tokyo Monorail station opened on 19 June 1992. The TWR Rinkai Line station opened on 31 March 2001.

Station numbering was introduced to the Rinkai Line platforms in 2016 with Tennōzu Isle being assigned station number R05.

Passenger statistics
In fiscal 2011, the Tokyo Monorail station was used by an average of 26,651 passengers daily, and the TWR station was used by 15,513 passengers daily.

Surrounding area
 Tokyo Immigration Bureau
 Sea Fort Square
 NYK Tennoz Building 
Marza Animation Planet Headquarters
Daiichi Hotel Tokyo Sea Fort

See also

 List of railway stations in Japan

References

External links

 Tokyo Monorail Tennōzu Isle Station 
 TWR Tennōzu Isle Station 

TWR Rinkai Line
Tokyo Monorail Haneda Line
Stations of Tokyo Waterfront Area Rapid Transit
Stations of Tokyo Monorail
Railway stations in Tokyo
Railway stations in Japan opened in 1992
Railway stations in Japan opened in 2001